Khotehang is a rural municipality (gaunpalika) in Khotang District of Province No. 1 of Nepal.

History
Fulfilling the requirement of the new Constitution of Nepal 2015, the Ministry of Federal Affairs and Local Development replaced all old VDCs and Municipalities into 753 new local level body (Municipality). Therefore, Indrayani Pokhari, Khotang Bazar, Chipring, Badka Dipali, Linkuwa Pokhari, Lichki Ramche, Woplukha, Sawakatahare and Simpani which previously were all separate Village development committees merged to form this new local level body.{cn}

The rural municipality is divided into total 9 wards and the headquarter of this newly formed rural municipality is situated in Khotang Bazar.

Transportation
Thamkharka Airport lies in Old-Khotang Bazar offering flights to Biratnagar and Kathmandu.

References

External links
 Official website
 Final District 1-75 Corrected Last for RAJPATRA

Rural municipalities in Koshi Province
Populated places in Khotang District
Rural municipalities of Nepal established in 2017
Rural municipalities in Khotang District